Andrea Costa (1851–1910) was an Italian politician. Initiated in September 25 1883 to the Masonic Lodge "Rienzi" in Rome, he progressively become 32nd degree Mason and adjunctive Great Master of the Grande Oriente d'Italia.

Costa was arrested in the failed Bakuninist 1874 Bologna insurrection as its head Italian organizer.

He co-founded the Partito dei Lavoratori Italiani in 1892 after renouncing his anarchist principles in 1879. It is probable that this happened due to his marriage to Russian Socialist Anna Kulischov. In his later years Costa was an active politician; he served as mayor of Imola and as a representative in the Italian Parliament. He died in Imola in 1910.

His close friend and masonic brother Giovanni Pascoli wrote the funeral inscription dedicated to him, whom he knew together with Alceste Faggioli when he was a university student.

References

Sources
 Centenario della morte di Andrea Costa – Biography
 Edward Bernstein: My Years of Exile (Chap. 2) at www.marxists.org

1851 births
1910 deaths
People from Imola
Italian Socialist Party politicians
Deputies of Legislature XV of the Kingdom of Italy
Deputies of Legislature XVI of the Kingdom of Italy
Deputies of Legislature XVII of the Kingdom of Italy
Deputies of Legislature XVIII of the Kingdom of Italy
Deputies of Legislature XIX of the Kingdom of Italy
Deputies of Legislature XX of the Kingdom of Italy
Deputies of Legislature XXI of the Kingdom of Italy
Deputies of Legislature XXII of the Kingdom of Italy
Deputies of Legislature XXIII of the Kingdom of Italy
Politicians of Emilia-Romagna
Italian political party founders